Scantling is a measurement of prescribed size, dimensions, or cross sectional areas.

Shipping
In shipbuilding, the scantling refers to the collective dimensions of the framing (apart from the keel) to which planks or plates are attached to form the hull.  The word is most often used in the plural to describe how much structural strength in the form of girders, I-beams, etc., is in a given section. The scantling length refers to the structural length of a ship.

In shipping, a "full scantling vessel" is understood to be a geared ship, that can reach all parts of its own cargo spaces with its own gear.

Timber and stone
In regard to timber, the scantling is (also "the scantlings are") the thickness and breadth, the sectional dimensions; in the case of stone the dimensions of thickness, breadth and length.

The word is a variation of scantillon, a carpenter's or stonemason's measuring tool, also used of the measurements taken by it, and of a piece of timber of small size cut as a sample. Sometimes synonymous with story pole. The Old French escantillon, mod. échantillon, is usually taken to be related to Italian scandaglio, sounding-line (Latin scandere, to climb; cf. scansio, the metrical scansion). It was probably influenced by cantel, cantle, a small piece, a corner piece.

References

 Oxford English Dictionary

External links 

Units of length
Nautical terminology
Timber framing